Daring Adventures is the fifth studio album by Richard Thompson, released in 1986.

After sales of his 1985 release Across a Crowded Room had not met expectations, Thompson was under pressure from his record label to deliver with his next album.

The first Thompson album to be recorded in the USA, Daring Adventures is a marked departure from its predecessors with a slicker, more commercial sound and backing provided by American session players. It marked the start of a controversial five-album collaboration between Thompson and new producer Mitchell Froom that was regarded, in some quarters, to have "Americanised" and commercialised Thompson's style and sound. The album is variously seen as a sell-out under pressure from a record company, or as an attempt to reach a wider audience.

With songs like "A Bone Through Her Nose", "Baby Talk" and "Valerie", the album also marked a shift in Thompson's songwriting away from the seemingly personal and towards the character portraits for which he has since become renowned. "Al Bowlly's in Heaven" and "How Will I Ever Be Simple Again" are two of Thompson's best-loved songs and concert staples, the latter is also one of the more frequently covered Thompson songs.

Track listing
All songs written by Richard Thompson

"A Bone Through Her Nose"
"Valerie"
"Missie How You Let Me Down"
"Dead Man's Handle"
"Long Dead Love"
"Lover's Lane"
"Nearly In Love"
"Jennie"
"Baby Talk"
"Cash Down, Never Never"
"How Will I Ever Be Simple Again"
"Al Bowlly's in Heaven"

Personnel
Richard Thompson - guitar, vocals, mandolin, dulcimer, theremin
Mitchell Froom - keyboards, theremin
Jerry Scheff - bass guitar, double bass
Mickey Curry - drums
Jim Keltner - drums
Alex Acuña - percussion
Christine Collister and Clive Gregson  - backing vocals
John Kirkpatrick - accordion, concertina
Philip Pickett - shawm, crumhorn, recorder and symphony.
Chuck Fleming - fiddle
Brian Taylor, Tony Goddard, David Horn, Ian Peters - brass

References

1986 albums
Richard Thompson (musician) albums
Albums produced by Mitchell Froom
Polydor Records albums